The 1963 Florida State Seminoles baseball team represented Florida State University in the 1963 NCAA University Division baseball season. The Seminoles played their home games at Seminole Field. The team was coached by Danny Litwhiler in his ninth and final season at Florida State.

The Seminoles reached the College World Series, their third appearance in Omaha, where they finished tied for fifth place after recording an opening round win against Western Michigan, then losing against eventual runner-up Arizona and eventual champion Southern California.

Personnel

Roster

Coaches

Schedule and results

References

Florida State Seminoles baseball seasons
Florida State Seminoles
College World Series seasons
Florida State Seminoles baseball